Irving John Good (9 December 1916 – 5 April 2009)
was a British mathematician who worked as a cryptologist at Bletchley Park with Alan Turing. After the Second World War, Good continued to work with Turing on the design of computers and Bayesian statistics at the University of Manchester. Good moved to the United States where he was professor at Virginia Tech.

He was born Isadore Jacob Gudak to a Polish Jewish family in London. He later anglicised his name to Irving John Good and signed his publications "I. J. Good."

An originator of the concept now known as "intelligence explosion," Good served as consultant on supercomputers to Stanley Kubrick, director of the 1968 film 2001: A Space Odyssey.

Life
Good was born Isadore Jacob Gudak to Polish Jewish parents in London. His father was a watchmaker, who later managed and owned a successful fashionable jewellery shop, and was also a notable Yiddish writer writing under the pen name of Moshe Oved. Good was educated at the Haberdashers' Aske's Boys' School, at the time in Hampstead in northwest London, where, according to Dan van der Vat, Good effortlessly outpaced the mathematics curriculum.

Good studied mathematics at Jesus College, Cambridge, graduating in 1938 and winning the Smith's Prize in 1940. He did research under G. H. Hardy and Abram Besicovitch before moving to Bletchley Park in 1941 on completing his doctorate.

Bletchley Park
On 27 May 1941, having just obtained his doctorate at Cambridge, Good walked into Hut 8, Bletchley's facility for breaking German naval ciphers, for his first shift. This was the day that Britain's Royal Navy destroyed the  after it had sunk the Royal Navy's . Bletchley had contributed to Bismarcks destruction by discovering, through wireless-traffic analysis, that the German flagship was sailing for Brest, France, rather than Wilhelmshaven, from which she had set out.
Hut 8 had not, however, been able to decrypt on a current basis the 22 German Naval Enigma messages that had been sent to Bismarck.  The German Navy's Enigma cyphers were considerably more secure than those of the German Army or Air Force, which had been well penetrated by 1940. Naval messages were taking three to seven days to decrypt, which usually made them operationally useless for the British. This was about to change, however, with Good's help.

Good served with Turing for nearly two years.
  
Subsequently, he worked with Donald Michie in Max Newman's group on the Fish ciphers, leading to the development of the Colossus computer.

Good was a member of the Bletchley Chess Club which defeated the Oxford University Chess Club 8–4 in a twelve-board team match held on 2 December 1944. Good played fourth board for Bletchley Park, with C.H.O'D. Alexander, Harry Golombek and James Macrae Aitken in the top three spots. He won his game against Sir Robert Robinson.

Postwar work
In 1947 Newman invited Good to join him and Turing at Manchester University. There for three years Good lectured in mathematics and researched computers, including the Manchester Mark 1.

In 1948 Good was recruited by the Government Communications Headquarters (GCHQ), successor to Bletchley Park. He remained there until 1959, while also taking up a brief associate professorship at Princeton University and a short consultancy with IBM.

From 1959 until he moved to the US in 1967, Good held government-funded positions and from 1964 a senior research fellowship at Trinity College, Oxford, and the Atlas Computer Laboratory, where he continued his interests in computing, statistics and chess. He later left Oxford, declaring it "a little stiff".

United States
In 1967 Good moved to the United States, where he was appointed a research professor of statistics at Virginia Polytechnic Institute and State University. In 1969 he was appointed a University Distinguished Professor at Virginia Tech, and in 1994 Emeritus University Distinguished Professor.
In 1973 he was elected as a Fellow of the American Statistical Association.

He later said about his arrival in Virginia (from Britain) in 1967 to start teaching at VPI, where he taught from 1967 to 1994:

Research and publications
Good's published work ran to over three million words.
He was known for his work on Bayesian statistics. Kass and Raftery credit Good (and in turn Turing) with coining the term Bayes factor. Good published a number of books on probability theory. In 1958 he published an early version of what later became known as the fast Fourier transform but it did not become widely known. He played chess to county standard and helped popularise Go, an Asian boardgame, through a 1965 article in New Scientist (he had learned the rules from Alan Turing). In 1965 he originated the concept now known as "intelligence explosion" or the "technological singularity", which anticipates the eventual advent of superhuman intelligence:

Good's authorship of treatises such as his 1965 "Speculations Concerning the First Ultraintelligent Machine" and "Logic of Man and Machine" made him the obvious person for Stanley Kubrick to consult when filming 2001: A Space Odyssey (1968), one of whose principal characters was the paranoid HAL 9000 supercomputer. In 1995 Good was elected a member of the Academy of Motion Picture Arts and Sciences. Graphcore's proposed foundation model $600m computer, that uses Human-Centered Artificial Intelligence, which will have the potential capacity of running programs with 500trn parameters, was named to honor Good's intellectual heritage. According to The Economist, Graphcore aims to take the "first step" towards creating I. J. Good's  imagined "Ultraintelligent Machine".

According to his assistant, Leslie Pendleton, in 1998 Good wrote in an unpublished autobiographical statement that he suspected an ultraintelligent machine would lead to the extinction of man.

Personality
Good published a paper under the names IJ Good and "K Caj Doog"—the latter, his own nickname spelled backwards. In a 1988 paper, he introduced its subject by saying, "Many people have contributed to this topic but I shall mainly review the writings of I. J. Good because I have read them all carefully." In Virginia he chose, as his vanity licence plate, "007IJG," in subtle reference to his Second World War intelligence work.

Good never married. After going through ten assistants in his first thirteen years at Virginia Tech, he hired Leslie Pendleton, who proved up to the task of managing his quirks. He wanted to marry her, but she refused. Although there was speculation, they were never more than friends, but she was his assistant, companion, and friend for the rest of his life.

Death
Good died on 5 April 2009 of natural causes in Radford, Virginia, aged 92.

Books

Significant Papers
Good, I. J.. “Explicativity, corroboration, and the relative odds of hypotheses.” Synthese 30 (1975): 39-73.

See also
Good–Turing frequency estimation
Cryptanalysis of the Enigma
 MacMahon Master theorem

Notes

References

Bibliography
 Dan van der Vat, "Jack Good" (obituary), The Guardian, 29 April 2009, p. 32.
 Hugh Sebag-Montefiore, Enigma: The Battle for the Code, London, Weidenfeld & Nicolson, 2000, .

External links

 
 Good's web page at Virginia Tech
 Bibliography ("Shorter Publications List", running to 2300 items) (PDF)
 Biography focusing on Good's role in the history of computing
 Project Euclid An interview with Good can be downloaded from here
 VT Image Base Photographs
 Obituary, Virginia Tech, 6 April 2009
 Obituary, Daily Telegraph, 10 April 2009
 Obituary, The Times, 16 April 2009
 Obituary, The Independent, 14 May 2009
 Eulogy Mathematical eulogy (with Maple code) by Doron Zeilberger, 2 December 2009

1916 births
2009 deaths
20th-century American mathematicians
21st-century American mathematicians
20th-century American philosophers
Alan Turing
Alumni of Jesus College, Cambridge
American people of British-Jewish descent
American people of Polish-Jewish descent
American statisticians
Artificial intelligence researchers
Bayesian statisticians
British cryptographers
British information theorists
British people of Polish-Jewish descent
English emigrants to the United States
English Jews
English mathematicians
English statisticians
Fellows of the American Statistical Association
GCHQ people
Modern cryptographers
Bletchley Park people
People educated at Haberdashers' Boys' School
People from Hampstead
People from Radford, Virginia
Singularitarians
Theoretical computer scientists
Foreign Office personnel of World War II
Mathematicians from Virginia
American cosmologists